Dendrobium rupicoloides, commonly known as the northern rock orchid, is a species of lithophytic orchid that is endemic to tropical North Queensland. It has tapered green to reddish pseudobulbs, up to three thick, leathery leaves and up to fifty white flowers with purple markings on the labellum.

Description 
The sides lobes are crescent moon-shaped and the middle lobe is short with an orange ridge along its midline. Flowering occurs between October and December.

Taxonomy and naming
The northern rock orchid was first formally described in 2006 by David Jones and Mark Clements from a plant grown in the Australian National Botanic Gardens from a specimen collected near Blencoe Falls. It was given the name Thelychiton rupicola and the description was published in Australian Orchid Research. In 2014, Julian Shaw changed the name to Dendrobium rupicoloides because the name Dendrobium rupicola was already given to a different orchid. The specific epithet (rupicola) given by Jones and Brown is derived from the Latin rupes meaning "rock", and -cola meaning "dweller" or "inhabitant", referring to the lithophytic habit of this orchid. The ending -oides means "like" or "resembling".

Distribution and habitat
Dendrobium rupicoloides grows on boulders and cliffs in areas near the Mount Windsor and Atherton Tablelands and possibly as far south as Sarina.

References

rupicoloides
Endemic orchids of Australia
Orchids of Queensland
Plants described in 2006